NCAA Division I Football Championship Subdivision independent schools are four-year institutions in the United States whose football programs are not part of a football conference. This means that FCS independents are not required to schedule each other for competition as conference schools do.

Current FCS independents

Former FCS independents
The following is a complete list of teams which have been Division I-AA/FCS Independents since the formation of Division I-AA in 1978. The "Current Conference" column indicates affiliations for the 2022 college football season. Years listed in this table are football seasons; since football is a fall sport, this means that the final season of independent status, or for membership in a given conference, is the calendar year before a conference change took effect.

Teams in italics are current FBS members; this includes second-year transitional schools that are counted as FBS for scheduling purposes but not bowl game eligibility. Because James Madison met FBS scheduling requirements in its first season in the Sun Belt Conference in 2022 (specifically five home games against FBS opposition), it was allowed to skip the first year of the normal two-year process.

See also
 List of American collegiate athletic stadiums and arenas
 List of NCAA Division I FCS football programs
 NCAA Division I FBS independent schools
 NCAA Division I independent schools
 NCAA Division II independent schools
 NCAA Division III independent schools
 NAIA independent schools

Notes

References

NCAA Division I FCS football independents